Epidromia poaphiloides is a moth of the family Erebidae first described by Achille Guenée in 1852. It is found in Brazil, French Guiana and Guyana.

References

Moths described in 1852
Calpinae